Baroda Football Academy is a professional football academy based in Vadodara, Gujarat, India. Its women's team participates in Indian Women's League.

History 
Baroda Football Academy was founded in 2008 in Vadodara, Gujarat. Baroda Football Academy is one of the largest and most successful soccer academies in Gujarat. With its presence for more than a decade, it has endowed nearly 9,000 children, between 5 and 19 years of age with professional training.

Baroda Football Academy is the only academy in Vadodara, Gujarat, to be accredited with AIFF - All India Football Federation, New Delhi, giving its players an opportunity to participate in the National Youth League for U13, U15 & U18 years Boys tournaments conducted by AIFF.

Baroda FA won the Gujarat Women's League 2019.
In 2021 Baroda FA participated in Futsal Club Championship after winning Gujrat Futsal Championship with name Baroda FC.

Stadium
BFA does not have a football stadium but it plays its home games on its home ground in BFA sports complex, Gotri.

Current squad

Men's

Note: Flags indicate national team as defined under FIFA eligibility rules. Players may hold more than one non-FIFA nationality.

Women's 
Note: Flags indicate national team as defined under FIFA eligibility rules. Players may hold more than one non-FIFA nationality.

Technical staff
President: Vimal Upadhyay

Journey in Indian Women's League 
2017-18 - preliminary round

2018-19 - final round group stage 5th position

2019-20 -  final round group stage 5th position

References 

Football academies in India
Football clubs in Gujarat
Women's football clubs in India
Indian Women's League clubs